Laura Landauer is a Canadian actress, singer and comedian best known for her impersonation of Celine Dion and her video "The Celine Dion Workout". Laura appeared as a guest judge on Video on Trial and as a finalist on Bathroom Divas. She also appeared in The Love Guru, and played the part of Shapeshifter on Odd Squad.

She was born in Montreal, Quebec and studied theatre at Dawson College (The Dome Theatre).

She is most recognized by her tall stature and strong chin.

External links
Official site
Review of “The Celine Dion Workout"

Living people
Actresses from Montreal
Musicians from Montreal
Canadian comedy musicians
Canadian television actresses
Canadian women comedians
Comedians from Montreal
Dawson College alumni
Year of birth missing (living people)